Abdeslam Boulaich is a Moroccan story-teller, some of whose stories have been translated by Paul Bowles from Moroccan Arabic to English.  Boulaich's stories have been studied in college courses.

References 

Moroccan storytellers
People from Tangier
Year of birth missing (living people)
Living people